Al-Ghantoo or al-Ghantu, ALA-LC: al-Ghānṭū: but the original name is spelled: الغُنْثُر/ Al-Ghonthor, which means the land of fountains) is a town in the west of Syria, administratively part of the Homs Governorate, located  north of Homs. Nearby towns include Talbisa to the northeast and Taldou further to the northwest.  According to the Central Bureau of Statistics (CBS), al-Ghantu had a population of 9,412 in 2004. Its inhabitants are predominantly Sunni Muslims,

Most of its residents work in agriculture, and many farmers specialize in vegetables such as lettuce, cabbage, tomatoes, carrots, peppers and others. Olive groves have increased annually. There are many places of interest in the village including old Ancient Roman bridges and water mills on the al-Assali River which  passes through the west side of the village.

On 11 June 2012, anti-government fighters from the Free Syrian Army (FSA) attacked the small military airbase situated in al-Ghantu, as part of the ongoing 2011-2012 Syrian uprising against President Bashar al-Assad. The FSA was quickly repelled by a Syrian Army counterattack, but managed to withdraw with hundreds of looted weapons and ammunition. According to FSA officials, they were able to enter the base after being aided by 22 sympathetic soldiers and officers stationed at the base.

Gallery

References

Bibliography

External links
Satellite View of al-Ghantoo

Populated places in al-Rastan District